Crime Scene (released 2010 on the ECM label - ECM 2041) is an album by guitarist Terje Rypdal recorded in 2009.

Reception
The Allmusic review awarded the album 4 stars.

Track listing
All compositions by Terje Rypdal except as indicated
«Clint - The Menace» (2:15)
«Prime Suspects» (6:55)
«Don Rypero» (5:31)
«Suspicious Behaviour» (2:55)
«The Good Cop» (3:44)
«Is That a Fact» (4:14)
«Parli con me?!» (Paolo Vinaccia) (5:26)
«The Criminals» (3:02)
«Action» (2:17)
«One of Those» (2:59)
«It's Not Been Written Yet» (8:53)
«Investigation» (5:46)
«A Minor Incident» (2:18)
«Crime Solved» (3:03)

Personnel
Terje Rypdal — electric guitar
Palle Mikkelborg — trumpet
Ståle Storløkken — Hammond B-3 organ
Paolo Vinaccia — drums & sampling

Bergen Big Band
Olav Dale — director, flute, piccolo flute, alto flute & bass clarinet
Jan Kåre Hystad — alto flute, clarinet & bass clarinet
Ole Jacob Hystad — tenor saxophone & clarinet
Zoltan Vincze — tenor saxophone
Michael Barnes — baritone saxophone & bass clarinet
Martin Winter — lead trumpet & flugelhorn
Svein Henrik Giske — trumpet & flugelhorn
Are Ovesen — flugelhorn
Reid Gilje — flugelhorn
Øyvind Hage — lead trombone
Sindre Dalhaug — trombone
Pål Roseth — trombone
Kjell Erik Husom — bass trombone
Ole Thomsen — electric guitar
Helge Lilletvedt — electric piano
Magne Thormodsæter — double bass & electric bass
Frank Jakobsen — drums & percussion

Notes 
Recorded May 2009 at Nattjazz, Bergen

References

ECM Records live albums
Terje Rypdal albums
2010 albums
Albums produced by Manfred Eicher